Ana Lúcia Torre Rodrigues (born 21 April 1945) is a Brazilian actress.

Biography 
Ana Lúcia Torre was born in São Paulo. As a child, her family moved to the city of Rio de Janeiro and then to São Paulo.

She began studying social sciences at Pontifical Catholic University of São Paulo in 1965 where she soon became interested in campus theater groups. The institution's director wanted only one theater group, which it raffled with the subscribers. Torre passed the tests that involved text decoration and creation of scenes and interpretation. The group assembled and reproduced the show Morte e Vida Severina. Among her university theater colleagues were musician, playwright and author Chico Buarque de Hollanda and artist Cláudio Tozzi.

Passionate about the artistic world, Torre switched from social sciences in 1966 to pursue a professional courses in theater in Lisbon. There, she lived in a student republic, funded by her parents. After a year and a half of studying, creating pieces and introducing herself, Ana Lucia met a Brazilian who became her first boyfriend and would be her first husband. In 1968, she married her boyfriend and they moved to Oslo, Norway so he could study maritime law. In this distant country, Torre learned Norwegian (and English), and worked as a hotel maid, a store saleswoman and later as a secretary of the Brazilian Embassy. After four years the couple moved to London for a year, where her husband continued his studies. She worked as an administrative executive at the Brazilian Aeronautics Commission. In 1973, they moved to São Paulo. She and her husband reunited a great pair of friends: theater director Celso Nunes and Regina Braga, parents of the actor Gabriel Braga Nunes. Celso invited Torre to act in the play Equus, and at age 30, Torre entered the theater professionally. After a few years, the couple divorced. She married twice more.

Career 
She has performed in theater plays throughout Brazil and abroad. In television she began her career in 1977, in Dona Xepa, where she played Glorita. One of her greatest roles in television was Debora, in the telenovela Soul Mate. She participated in productions such as the first version of Ciranda de Pedra, Tieta, Renascer, A Indomada, Cravo and Rosa, Alma Gêmea, The Prophet, Seven Sins, Faces & Bocas, and Foolish Heart. She acted in Amor Eterno Amor as Verbena Borges. In 2013 she appeared in Joia Rara. In 2015 she played Hilda in the telenovela Eleven Secret Truths. In the assembly for the theater of Death and Vida Severina, by João Cabral de Mello Neto, she won first place at the International Festival of University Theater.

She lived for seven years in Europe, then again in Brazil, where she starred in several pieces such as Seria Cômico se não Fosse Sério, a show that earned her the nomination for best actress for the 2010 Shell award.

Filmography

Television

Cinema

Stage 
 Morte e Vida Severina
 Eles não Usam Black-tie
 Rose Rose
 Tartuffe
 Norma
 Arsênico e Alfazema
 Seria Cômico Se Não Fosse Sério
 Suburbano Coração (1989–1990)
 Como se Tornar uma Super Mãe

Awards

References

External links

1945 births
Living people
Actresses from São Paulo
Brazilian telenovela actresses
Brazilian film actresses
Brazilian stage actresses
20th-century Brazilian actresses
21st-century Brazilian actresses